S120 may refer to :
 HMS Ambush (S120), a 2007-2008 proposed Astute-class nuclear Fleet submarine of the Royal Navy
 S Papanikolis (S 120), a Type 214 submarine
 RENFE Class 120 (RENFE Serie 120 or S-120) high speed train
 Canon PowerShot S120 digital camera